The Stevens–Bruxner ministry (1938–1939) or Third Stevens–Bruxner ministry or Third Stevens ministry was the 48th ministry of the New South Wales Government, and was led by the 25th Premier, Bertram Stevens, in a United Australia Party coalition with the Country Party, that was led by Michael Bruxner. The ministry was the third of three occasions when the Government was led by Stevens, as Premier; and third of four occasions where Bruxner served as Deputy Premier.

Stevens was first elected to the New South Wales Legislative Assembly in 1927 and served continuously until 1940. Having served as a senior minister in the Bavin ministry, following the defeat of the Nationalist coalition led by Bavin, who was in poor health, at the 1930 state election, Stevens was elected leader of the newly formed United Australia Party in New South Wales and became Leader of the Opposition. Bruxner was first elected to the Assembly in 1920 and served continuously until 1962. Initially a member of the Progressive Party, he served as party leader in opposition between 1922 and 1925; and resumed leadership in 1932, following the resignation of his successor, Ernest Buttenshaw. By this stage, the party was renamed as the Country Party.

The Stevens–Bruxner coalition came to power as a result of the Lang Dismissal Crisis, when the Governor of New South Wales, Philip Game used the reserve power of The Crown to remove Jack Lang as Premier, asking Stevens to form government. Going to the polls a month later, Stevens/Bruxner won a landslide victory at the 1932 election and were re-elected at the 1935 and 1938 elections, albeit with reduced margins. There had been six by-elections during the ministry, with  picking up two seats from the government.

This ministry covers the period from 13 April 1938 until 5 August 1939. On 21 July 1939 Eric Spooner, the deputy leader of the United Australia Party, resigned from cabinet. Spooner had been a protege of Stevens, however their relationship deteriorated, particularly in relation to the Country Party. On 1 August 1939 Spooner moved a motion that was critical of Stevens, describing him as running the party as a dictatorship, and the proposal to cut government spending in order to restrain a growing deficit. Stevens stated that he regarded it as a motion of censure. The coalition had a large majority in the assembly, however the motion was passed 43 to 41, with nine United Australia members joining Spooner in voting against the government. Having lost the confidence of the assembly, Stevens resigned as Premier and leader of the party. Spooner had ambitions to replace Stevens as leader however Bruxner refused to join a coalition with him and Alexander Mair succeeded Stevens as Premier.

Composition of ministry

The composition of the ministry was announced by Premier Stevens on 13 April 1938. 

 
Ministers are members of the Legislative Assembly unless otherwise noted.

See also

First Stevens–Bruxner ministry
Second Stevens–Bruxner ministry
Members of the New South Wales Legislative Assembly, 1938-1941
Members of the New South Wales Legislative Council, 1937-1940

References

 

! colspan="3" style="border-top: 5px solid #cccccc" | New South Wales government ministries

New South Wales ministries
1938 establishments in Australia
1939 disestablishments in Australia